Armitage v Nurse [1997] EWCA Civ 1279 is the leading decision in English trusts law concerning the validity of exemption clauses. The Court of Appeal held that in English law trustee exemption clauses can validly exempt trustees from liability for all breaches of trust except fraud. Millet LJ gave the leading judgment.

Facts
Millett LJ summarises the facts at p. 248 of the report.

Judgment
In the hearing of the Court of Appeal, Bernard Weatherill QC for Armitage submitted that the "irreducible core" duties of a trustee include the following.
(1) a duty to inquire into the extent and nature the property and the trusts (see Hallows v Lloyd  (1888) 39 Ch D 686, 691; Nestlé v National Westminster Bank Plc [1993] 1 WLR 1260, 1265e, 1266h, 1275e-g and Wyman v Paterson [1900] AC 271);
(2) a duty to obey directions in the settlement unless the deviation is sanctioned by the court (see Harrison v Randall (1851) 9 Hare 397, 407 and Royal Brunei Airlines Sdn Bhd v Tan [1995] 2 AC 378, 390a-b);
(3) a duty to account for his stewardship of the assets under his control;
(4) a duty to carry on the business of the trust with the degree of prudence to be expected of a hypothetically reasonably prudent man of business (see Speight v Gaunt (1883) 9 App Cas 1, 19 and In re Whiteley, Whiteley v Learoyd (1886) 33 ChD 347, 355).

Gregory Hill made submissions for Nurse.

Court of Appeal
Millett LJ held that only a clause which purported to exclude liability for fraud would be considered repugnant and contrary to public policy. Thus the exclusion clause in favour of the trustee was allowed.

This case was cited by the NSW Supreme Court case of Maleski v Hampson.

See also
Trusts law

Notes

English trusts case law
Court of Appeal (England and Wales) cases
1997 in case law
1997 in British law